Ashthabhuja Prasad Shukla (born 20 December 1955) is an Indian politician. He represented the Khalilabad constituency in the Lok Sabha during 1991-1996 (10th Lok Sabha). He belongs to the Bharatiya Janata Party (BJP).

Shukla was born in Katarsoyam village in Basti district of Uttar Pradesh to Kapil Dev Shukla. He is married to Savitri Shukla and they have a son and two daughters. He is a resident of Katarsoyam village.

References

1955 births
Living people
India MPs 1991–1996
Lok Sabha members from Uttar Pradesh
Bharatiya Janata Party politicians from Uttar Pradesh